The Government of Austria is the executive cabinet of the Republic of Austria. It consists of the chancellor, who is the head of government, the vice chancellor and the ministers.

Appointment 
Since the 1929 reform of the Austrian Constitution, all members of the Federal Government are appointed by the Austrian Federal President. As the Federal Government must maintain the confidence of parliament, the President must generally abide by the will of that body in his or her appointments. In practice, the leader of the strongest political party, who ran as a "chancellor candidate" in a parliamentary election, is usually asked to become Federal Chancellor, though there have been some exceptions. Ministers are proposed for nomination by the Chancellor, though the President is permitted to withhold his or her approval. Likewise, the President may dismiss the Chancellor and/or the whole government at any time. If this occurs, a new government must then be formed by the parties that control parliament.

Meetings 

The government is convened for frequently scheduled meetings. When formally convened as such, the government is termed the Council of Ministers, which is equivalent to the word "cabinet". The Chancellor presides over cabinet meetings as first among equals without decisional authority, regardless of his right of proposal concerning the appointment of the government's members by the President. The cabinet adopts resolutions in the presence of at least half of its members and, according to the ruling of the Austrian Constitutional Court, unanimously – in particular the introduction of bills to the National Council. Each federal minister is also responsible for his or her own ministry, and may be supported by one or more state secretaries, who also participate in the cabinet's meetings. State secretaries are not considered members of the government, and have no right to vote during cabinet meetings.

Federal Ministries 

There are currently twelve Federal Ministries that all make up the Austrian cabinet. 

 Federal Chancellery
 Federal Ministry for Arts, Culture, the Civil Service and Sport
 Federal Ministry for Agriculture, Forestry, Regions and Water Management
 Federal Ministry for Climate Action, Environment, Energy, Mobility, Innovation and Technology
 Federal Ministry of Defence
 Federal Ministry of Education, Science and Research
 Federal Ministry of European and International Affairs
 Federal Ministry of Finance
 Federal Ministry of the Interior
 Federal Ministry of Justice
 Federal Ministry of Labour and Economy
 Federal Ministry of Social Affairs, Health, Care and Consumer Protection

History

First Republic 
After the dissolution of the Austro-Hungarian Monarchy, on 30 October 1918 the provisional national assembly of German Austria elected a State Council (Staatsrat) executive, which itself appointed a state government with the Social Democratic politician Karl Renner as head of the State Chancellery. The Renner ministry was composed of representatives of the three main political parties—Social Democrats, the Christian Social Party (CS) and German Nationalists (Greater Germans)—according to the Proporz doctrine. As acting executive body it remained in office until the Constitutional Assembly of the Austrian First Republic on 15 March 1919 elected Renner's second cabinet, a coalition government of Social Democratic and Christian Social ministers.

State Chancellor Renner had signed the Treaty of Saint-Germain-en-Laye, whereafter his cabinet retired en bloc. Re-elected by the Constitutional Assembly on 17 October 1919, his third cabinet was finally overturned with the break-up of the SPÖ-CS coalition on 7 July 1920. Renner was succeeded by the Christian Social politician Michael Mayr, who at the commencement of the Austria Constitution on 10 November 1920 became first Federal Chancellor of Austria. Mayr and his successors proceeded with the support of the Christian Social Party and the Greater German nationalists, while the Social Democrats remained in opposition.

From 5 March 1933 onwards, the Christian Social chancellor Engelbert Dollfuß continued to rule by suppressing the National Council parliament. In the course of the Austrian Civil War he brought down the opposition, and on 1 May 1934 implemented the authoritarian Federal State of Austria. All political parties were banned, except for the Fatherland's Front supporting Dollfuß' Austrofascist government. The Federal Government ceased at the Anschluss (the incorporation of Austria into Nazi Germany) on 13 March 1938.

Second Republic 
On 27 April 1945 a provisional Austrian national unity government, again under State Chancellor Karl Renner, declared the Anschluss null and void. It prepared the elections to the Austrian National Council held on 25 November. On 20 December 1945, the Austrian Constitution was officially re-enacted, with ÖVP founder Leopold Figl forming the first post-war Federal Government.

List of cabinets since 1945:

References

External links
 Austrian Federal Government

 
Austria
Politics of Austria
European governments